Don't Feed the Gondolas is an Irish comedy panel show, that ran for four series on Network 2 between 1997 and 2001. The show was hosted by Seán Moncrieff and the longest-serving panellists were Brendan O'Connor and Dara Ó Briain.

The name of the show is attributed to a remark made by a Wicklow County Councillor, Jimmy Miley, during a meeting regarding Blessington Lake. When the meeting proposed putting a gondola on the lake, he remarked: "That's all very well, but who's going to feed it?"

A running gag of the show, whereby the host Seán Moncrieff would make prank calls under the alias 'Monica Loolly' and claim to be from a small town in Galway named Ahascragh.

References

External links

 Information on Don't Feed the Gondolas

1997 Irish television series debuts
2001 Irish television series endings
Irish panel shows
RTÉ original programming